Jonathan Gooch (born 22 August 1984 in Hertfordshire, England), more commonly known by his stage names Feed Me and Spor, is a British drum and bass, dubstep and electro house producer and DJ. He is currently managed by Three Six Zero Group.

Biography

Jonathan Gooch first went by the name Spor when he started music production. After a successful partnership with Renegade Hardware and Barcode Recordings, and releases with Teebee's Subtitles Recordings, in 2006, Spor and long-term friend Chris Renegade launched Lifted Music and signed music from producers such as Apex, Evol Intent, Ewun and Phace.

On 24 February 2010, Spor released his second double EP, Conquerors and Commoners, on the Lifted Music label. In an interview with K Magazine, he said the title was inspired from a quote by Harlan Ellison. The album was well received by drum and bass fans, with two of the tracks from the album ("Halogen" and "Kingdom") being played on Andy C's Nightlife 5 mix CD. Spor has since then been playing his music at clubs across the world under the Lifted Music guise. Gooch was also involved in a second side project called the "Seventh Stitch", which produced alternative IDM. Under this alias, he worked with another artist named Andrew Aker on a track entitled "Oceans".

Gooch also has an electro house and dubstep project: Feed Me. A two-track EP titled "Raw Chicken" was released under deadmau5's label, mau5trap. Another track, "Mordez Moi" was released on Noisia's label Division alongside the group's original track "B.R.U.L.". He released a second EP under mau5trap on 25 December 2010, titled Feed Me's Big Adventure. It featured eight tracks, including both electro house and dubstep. His third EP of four tracks called To the Stars was released on 3 June 2011. He released another EP titled Feed Me's Escape From Electric Mountain on 6 February 2012. It features six tracks, with vocals from Hadouken! and Lindsay.

On 20 August 2012, Gooch released a new single titled "Little Cat Steps". Soon after, it was revealed he was producing a full-length album. On 28 October, he released another single with folk band Crystal Fighters, titled "Love Is All I Got". The EP also features four remixes, including Gooch's "Matilda" remix. On 20 December, he stated on Twitter, "One more single and two B sides, then it's album and tour time." The tracks were posted on his SoundCloud, and were titled "Death by Robot", "Dial-Up" and "Gravel". The Death by Robot EP was released on 16 January 2013.

On 22 May 2013 Gooch released a series of statements on his Twitter informing his fans that, come Autumn, there will be a hiatus in his DJing. He explained to his fans, 'What I really love doing is making music, art, telling stories; being creative. I don't want a situation where this becomes a back seat.' He later tweeted, 'Seems common to assume writing music means wanting to DJ - I started by accident? It's a fun and enriching social experience but not art.' He later confirmed via Facebook that he will resume touring in 2014 after he has spent time creating a short film featuring Feed Me, established his own label, working on artwork for his shows, and writing his next studio album.

Gooch has founded the record label Sotto Voce to release music under the Feed Me alias as well as provide a platform for new, aspiring artists to release their music. His debut studio album Calamari Tuesday was released on 14 October 2013 through the new label featuring 15 original tracks from his alias Feed Me, two of which were previously released as singles. It was revealed in an interview with DJ Mag that Gooch would like to release albums under each of his Spor, Feed Me and Seventh Stitch aliases in 2013.

Gooch has also appeared on the podcast/radio show DVDASA on 15 January 2014.

Gooch released "Caligo" as Spor on 19 February 2015 on his own label, Sotto Voce - the 13 track album was released via BitTorrent on a pay-what-you-want model, and included additional art and unreleased mix material.

Gooch (as Spor) collaborated with producer Linguistics for an addition to the compilation album "Mind State, Vol. 1" in 2018. The album's proceeds benefited mental health charities and was connected to a 24-hour mental health festival.

On 23 January 2019 Gooch announced via Twitter that a new album, titled "High Street Creeps", would be released on 22 February 2019 via mau5trap. The promotional single 'Feel Love' was released on 8 February 2019.

Discography

As Feed Me

Charted studio albums

Charted extended plays

Charted singles

Releases

Guest appearances

Production credits

Remixes

As Spor and Unicron
 Spor – "Judderman" / "The Whisper" (2004) (DMIND008)
 Spor – "Running Man" (2004) (NITE002)
 Spor – "Outbroken (That Track)" (2004) (RH62)
 Spor – "Nebulous" (2004) (RH62CD)
 Spor – "Haywire" (2004) (RH63)
 Spor – "Three Ravens" (2004) (BAR04)
 Spor – "Insecticide" (2004) (TOV67)
 Unicron – "Orion's Five" (2005) (TOVLP06)
 Unknown Error / Unicron – "Shadows" (Unicron Remix) / "You Must Believe" (2005) (TOV69)
 Final Reckoning (Spor & Codex) – "Ghosthacker" (2005) (TOV71)
 Final Reckoning (Spor & Codex) – "Nothing Less" / "A Thousand Worlds" (2005) (TOV73)
 Spor – "Dante's Inferno" (2005) (BAR07)
 Spor – "Haunt Me" / "Brickbeats" (2005) (BAR08)
 Spor – "Way of the Samurai" (2005) (BARLP01)
 Spor – "Alpha Trion" (2005) (BARLP01CD)
 Spor – "Ultimate Technology" / "Cyberpunk" (2005) (BAR12)
 Spor – Tactics EP (2005) (RH72)
 Spor & Infiltrata – "Three Faces" (2006) (BAR14)
 Spor – "Ignition" (2006) (RH75/RHLP10)
 Spor – "Powder Monkey" (2006) (SUBTITLES055)
 Spor – "Knock You Down" (2006) (LFTD001)
 Spor – "Hydra" (2006) (ZIQ159)
 Spor – "Molehill" (2007) (SUBTITLES057)
 Spor – Supernova (2007) (LFTD002)
 Spor – From the Inside Out (with Apex, Ewun, Evol Intent & Phace) (2008) (LFTD003)
 Spor – Breath In, Scream Out EP. (2008) (SUBTITLES066)
 Spor – "Claret's March" / "Stoppit" (2008) (LFT005)
 Spor – "Aztec" / "Do Not Shake" (2009) (SHA025)
 Spor – "Silver Spaceman" / "Some Other Funk" (2009) (LFTD006)
 Spor – Conquerors & Commoners (2010) (LFTD009)
 Spor – "Knock You Down" (Eskmo Remix) (2010) (LFTDUB001)
 Noisia & Spor – "Falling Through" (2010) (VSN009)
 Spor – Pacifica EP (2011) (LFTDUB002)
 Phace & Spor – "Out of Focus" (2011) (NSGNLEP001)
 Spor – "Ziggurat" / "Push Me, Pull You" (2012) (LFTD013)
 Spor – Caligo (2015) (SOVO008)
 Spor - Black Eyed EP (2016) (SOVO012)
 Spor - "Pull the Sun Down" (with Linguistics) (part of a compilation) (2018) (GET001DD)
 Spor - "Anachronic" (2020)
 Remixes
 Konflict – "Messiah" (Spor Remix) (2005) (RH65P/RHLP06)
 Ewun – "Hate Machine" (Spor Remix) (2006) (BARLP02)
 The Qemists – "Stompbox" (Spor Remix) (2007) (ZEN 205)
 Evol Intent feat. Ewun – "8-Bit Bitch" (Spor Remix) (2008) (EILP001/EIR 5694/SYS5686)
 Bad Company UK – "Bullet Time" (Spor Remix) (2009) (BT003)
 Basement Jaxx feat. Sam Sparro – "Feelings Gone" (Spor Remix) (2009) (XLS461)
 Muse - Resistance (Spor Remix) (2009)
 Two Fingers feat. Sway – "That Girl" (Spor Remix) (2009) (BD134)
 Don Diablo & Example – "Hooligans" (Spor Remix) (2009) (DATA219)
 Hadouken! – "Turn the Lights Out" (Spor Remix) (2009) (SN012)
 Noisia – "Machine Gun" (Spor Remix) (2010) (DIVISION005)
 The Prodigy – "Nasty" (Spor Remix) (2015)
 Vaults – "Lifespan" (Spor Remix) (2015)
 Kumarion - "Want It" (Spor Remix) (2020)

References

External links 
 
 Lifted Music
 Sotto Voce Records
 
 
 Spor at Last.fm

1984 births
Living people
21st-century English musicians
Dubstep musicians
English DJs
English drum and bass musicians
English record producers
English male musicians
Musicians from Hertfordshire
Mau5trap artists
Electronic dance music DJs
21st-century British male musicians
Monstercat artists